"Don't Know Why" is the debut single by British London-based trio SoundGirl from their shelved debut studio album. The single was released on 19 June 2011 as a digital download in the United Kingdom. The official remix features teen rapper Mann.

Music video
A music video to accompany the release of "Don't Know Why" was first released onto YouTube on 27 April 2011, at a total length of three minutes and forty-six seconds.

Track listing

Chart performance

Release history

Origins
"Don't Know Why" is based on the track "Why (Does Your Love Hurt So Much)" by Natasha Thomas, which was released in 2003 by Epic Records and is in turn based on Carly Simon's 1982 single "Why". The SoundGirl and Natasha Thomas tracks both build on the success of the signature reggae/pop sound of Ace of Base.

References

External links

2011 debut singles
Songs written by Ant Whiting
2011 songs
Mercury Records singles
Songs written by Miranda Cooper
Songs written by Nile Rodgers
Songs written by Little Nikki
Songs written by Bernard Edwards